The Beat is a 1988 American drama film written and directed by Paul Mones. Lawrence Kasanoff was one of the executive producers.

Plot
A new kid moves into a tough neighborhood controlled by gangs, and tries to teach them poetry.

Cast 
 David Jacobson as Rex Voorhas Ormine
 William McNamara as Billy Kane
 Kara Glover as Kate Kane
 Stuart Alexander as Doug
 David McCarthy as Dirt - Larry
 John Savage as Frank Ellsworth  
 Markus Flanagan as Vis
 Paul Dillon as Lon Recchia 
 Reggie Rock Bythewood as Danny Lambeaux
 Tony Gillan as Auggie
 Lisa Richards as Amy Kahn  
 Richard Eigen as Ian Murphy
 Angie Zisser as Mary
 Cro-Mags as Iron Skulls

Release
The movie was first shown at The Cannes Film Festival in 1987 and released into U.S. theaters the next year, reportedly grossing less than $5,000. In 1989, Vestron Video released the movie on videocassette. The movie has never been released on DVD, and as of December 30, 2020, Lions Gate has not yet announced any plans for a DVD release.

References

External links
 

1987 films
1987 drama films
American independent films
Vestron Pictures films
Films shot in New York City
American drama films
Hood films
Films produced by Julia Phillips
Films scored by Carter Burwell
Films produced by Jon Kilik
1987 independent films
1980s English-language films
1980s American films